"Jesus Is a Soul Man" is a hit single by the American country singer Lawrence Reynolds. The song was co-written by Reynolds and Jack Cardwell. The track appeared in the 1970 Reynolds album released also as Jesus Is a Soul Man. The album peaked at No. 45 on the U.S. Country Albums chart in 1970.

Chart performance
The single was released in 1969, reaching No. 28 on the U.S. Billboard Hot 100 chart and No 10 in Australia.

Covers
"Jesus Is a Soul Man" has been covered by a great number of artists:
It was covered very notably by Hank Williams Jr in his 1969 album Sunday Morning
Johnny Rivers in a 1970 single release, as the B-side to "Into the Mystic."  Rivers' version of "Jesus Is a Soul Man" was later included in his compilation album  Summer Rain: The Essential Rivers (1964-1975).
Conway Twitty on his 1973 album Clinging to a Saving Hand.
Darrell Adams in The Adams Family 1970 album Bridge Over Troubled Water.
Roy Clark in his 1975 album Gospel: Songs of Strength.

Adaptations
The song "Schuhe Schwer Wie Stein" in German uses the same melody of "Jesus Is a Soul Man". Johnny Rivers' German release of "Jesus is a Soul Man" was titled "Jesus Is a Soul Man (Schuhe Schwer Wie Stein)" and released as a bilingual English / German song.

Popular culture
Johnny Cash performed the song live as a duet with Reynolds in May 1970 on The Johnny Cash Show.

References

1969 singles
Billy Grammer songs
1969 songs